Loves of an Actress is a lost 1928 American silent romantic drama film directed by Rowland V. Lee and starring Pola Negri. It was produced by Adolph Zukor and Jesse Lasky with the distribution through Paramount Pictures. The film had a soundtrack of either Vitaphone or Movietone of music and sound effects.

Cast
Pola Negri as Rachel
Nils Asther as Raoul Duval
Mary McAllister as Lisette
Richard Tucker as Baron Hartman
Philip Strange as Count Vareski
Paul Lukas as Dr. Durande
Nigel De Brulier as Samson
Robert Fischer as Count Moorency
Helen Giere as Marie

References

Bibliography
 Mariusz Kotowski. Pola Negri: Hollywood's First Femme Fatale. University Press of Kentucky, 2014.

External links
 Loves of an Actress at IMDb.com

1928 films
American silent feature films
Lost American films
Films directed by Rowland V. Lee
Paramount Pictures films
American romantic drama films
American black-and-white films
1928 lost films
Lost romantic drama films
1928 romantic drama films
Films scored by Karl Hajos
1920s American films
Silent romantic drama films
Silent American drama films